Jiří Zlatuška (born 15 September 1957 in Brno) is a Czech informaticist, university professor and politician. He was elected in the parliamentary election in 2013 to the Chamber of Deputies on the ANO 2011 platform. From 2015 to 2019 he was Dean of the Faculty of Informatics of the Masaryk University.

|-

Living people
1957 births
Politicians from Brno
ANO 2011 politicians
Academic staff of Masaryk University
Members of the Senate of the Czech Republic
Czech computer scientists
Masaryk University alumni
Members of the Chamber of Deputies of the Czech Republic (2013–2017)